Sergeye-Fyodorovka is a rural locality (a selo) in Novomikhaylovsky Selsoviet of Oktyabrsky District, Amur Oblast, Russia. The population was 119 as of 2018. There is 1 street.

Geography 
Sergeye-Fyodorovka is located 28 km south of Yekaterinoslavka (the district's administrative centre) by road. Novomikhaylovka is the nearest rural locality.

References 

Rural localities in Oktyabrsky District, Amur Oblast